Paanchi, once called Piye or Piankhi, is the king of Nubia and pharaoh of the 25th Dynasty of Egypt.

Paanchi may also refer to:
Paanchi (Book of Mormon), character from the Book of Mormon